XHFI-FM 96.5/XEFI-AM 580 is a radio station in Chihuahua City, Chihuahua, Mexico. It is owned by Grupo Radiorama and known as "Studio", airing a format of classic hits in English and Spanish.

History

XEFI was the first radio station in Chihuahua. It originated in 1921 as part of radio experiments conducted by the state government. By 1923, it was known as XICE, after Governor Ignacio C. Enríquez. In 1924, it became known as CFZ, and a full concession for XEFI at 1000 kHz was issued in 1932. In the 1940s, the station was transferred to El Pregonero del Estado de Chihuahua, S.A., owned by Ramiro G. Uranga; during this time, it operated at 1440 kHz. By the 1960s, the station had moved to 580.

In 1976, Radiorama bought the station, and in 2011, it received authorization to migrate to FM.

The station changed formats from Regional Mexican as "Fiesta Mexicana" in June 2020 to air Studio 96.5, a classic hits format.

References

Radio stations in Chihuahua
Radio stations established in 1923
Radio stations in Mexico with continuity obligations